Abdosamad Mirza Ez od-Dowleh Saloor (May 1843 – 1929) was a Persian prince of Qajar Dynasty and fifth son of Mohammad Shah Qajar by his wife Ogholbeigeh Khanum, a lady of Turkmen origin. He is the ancestor of Salour (Saloor) family.

In 1873, Ezz ed-Dowleh traveled with of his brother Naser al-Din Shahon the Shah’s visit to Europe. Ez ed-Dowleh was governor of Qazvin and Boroojerd in 1874, governor of Hamadan, Malayer, Tuyserkan and Nahavand from 1874–1876 and governor of Zanjan from 1901–1902. He died in Tehran in 1929 and was buried in Fatima al-Masumeh Shrine in Qom.

In 1882, Naser al-Din Shah sent Ezz ed-Dowleh as a Special Ambassador to the Court of Russia to congratulate Tsar Alexander III on his accession to the throne.

Notes

References

External links
 Genealogy of  Salour family
 Maryam Salour, Iranian Potter, Ceramist and Sculptor, descendant of Ez od-Doleh 
 Nader Ardalan, Iranian architect, descendant of Ez od-Doleh 

Qajar princes
1843 births
1929 deaths